Suoyarvsky District is an administrative district (raion), one of the fifteen in the Republic of Karelia, Russia. It is located in the west of the republic on the Finnish border. Its administrative center is the town of Suoyarvi. As of the 2010 Census, the total population of the district was 18,814, with the population of Suoyarvi accounting for 51.9% of that number.

Administrative and municipal status
Within the framework of administrative divisions, Suoyarvsky District is one of the fifteen in the Republic of Karelia and has administrative jurisdiction over one town (Suoyarvi) and twenty-six rural localities. As a municipal division, the district is incorporated as Suoyarvsky Municipal District. The town of Suoyarvi is incorporated into an urban settlement, while the twenty-six rural localities are incorporated into four rural settlements within the municipal district. The town of Suoyarvi serves as the administrative center of both the administrative and municipal district.

References

Notes

Sources



 
Districts of the Republic of Karelia